The 2012 Copa de México de Naciones is the 2nd edition of the Copa México de Naciones Sub-15 and it took place in Mexico from August 10 to August 18. The tournament is supposed to be the precursor the proposed U-15 FIFA World Cup. Twelve teams participated in this edition, four more than the 2013 edition.

The final match will be in the Estadio Azteca.

Participating teams

 (host)

Group stage
The winners and runners-up from each group, as well as the best two third-placed teams, qualified for the quarter finals.

The ranking of each team in each group was determined as follows:
a) greatest number of points obtained in all group matches;
b) goal difference in all group matches;
c) greatest number of goals scored in all group matches.

Had two or more teams been equal on the basis of the above three criteria, their rankings would have been determined as follows:
d) greatest number of points obtained in the group matches between the teams concerned;
e) goal difference resulting from the group matches between the teams concerned;
f) greater number of goals scored in all group matches between the teams concerned;

Group A

Group B

Group C

Ranking of third-placed teams
The two best teams among those ranked third were determined as follows:
 points obtained in all group matches;
 goal difference in all group matches;
 number of goals scored in all group matches;

Knockout stage
In the knockout stages, if a match is level at the end of normal playing time a kicks from the penalty mark to determine the winner.

Quarterfinals

Semifinals

Third place match

Final

Top Goalscorers

References

https://web.archive.org/web/20140517043309/http://copamexicodenaciones.mx/

Copa
2012–13 in Mexican football
Copa de México de Naciones
International association football competitions hosted by Mexico